Emil Ruusuvuori was the defending champion but chose not to defend his title.

Lukáš Lacko won the title after defeating Yasutaka Uchiyama 5–7, 7–6(10–8), 6–1 in the final.

Seeds

Draw

Finals

Top half

Bottom half

References

External links
Main draw
Qualifying draw

Rafa Nadal Open - 1